Othmar Zeidler (29 August 1850 – 17 June 1911) was an Austrian chemist credited with the first synthesis of DDT.

He was born on 29 August 1850 in Vienna a son of the Viennese pharmacist Franz Zeidler. Othmar's brother, Franz Zeidler Jr. (1851–1901), also became a chemist and would collaborate with him on several projects. As a doctoral student with Adolf von Baeyer at the University of Strasbourg, then in Germany, Zeidler is credited with the first synthesis of the insecticide Dichloro Diphenyl Trichloroethane or DDT in 1874. Othmar returned to Austria before 1876 and, after working at the I. chemischen Universitätslaboratorium at the University of Vienna, became a pharmacist in the Fünfhaus district of the capital. He died in Mauer near Vienna on 17 June 1911.

Notes

References

External links 
 History | CDC Malaria at www.cdc.gov
 

1850 births
1911 deaths
Austrian chemists
Austrian pharmacists
University of Strasbourg alumni
Scientists from Vienna